Vyacheslav Kazymyrovych Lypynsky (April 5, 1882 — June 14, 1931) was a Ukrainian historian, social and political activist, an ideologue of Ukrainian conservatism. He was also the founder of the Ukrainian Democratic–Agrarian Party. Under the government of Hetmanate, he served as the Ukrainian ambassador to Austria.

Biography
Lypynsky was born in Zaturtsi (now in Volyn Oblast) into a family of Polish noble origins. After completing secondary school in Kyiv, he studied philosophy, agronomy and history at Jagiellonian University in Krakow.  Lypynsky developed a particular interest in military matters and in the study of the ways in which, historically, the nobility shaped Ukrainian statehood, ultimately calling on the nobility within Ukraine to fight for that nation's rebirth. During the First World War he served as an officer in the Russian army, and afterward became involved in the struggle for Ukrainian independence, serving as the Ukrainian government's ambassador to Austria under the government of the Ukrainian Hetmanate as well as its successor, the Directorate of Ukraine.  He then lived abroad, in Berlin and Vienna, and became head of the Ukrainian Agrarian Statist Party as well as a leading monarchist, supporting the Ukrainian Hetman Pavlo Skoropadskyi. He died in the "Sanatorium Wienerwald" near Pernitz in 1931.

Views
A conservative monarchist, Lypynsky was critical of the populism and socialism of the leadership of the Ukrainian Central Rada and Directorate governments with their emphasis on the workers and intelligentsia as a source of support. Instead, Lypynsky proposed that the focus of the struggle of independence should be built around the peasantry, the bourgeois, and the elite.  Accordingly, he felt that a primary focus in the struggle for Ukrainian independence should be the conversion of the Russified or Polonized Ukrainian elite or nobility to the cause of Ukrainian statehood.  Lypynsky wrote that Ukrainian statehood depended on the loyalty of the Ukrainian population towards the Ukrainian state regardless of ethnic origins or social status.  A Ukrainian monarch, such as a Hetman, was seen by Lypynsky as essential in cementing the loyalties of the members of various social classes and ethnicities.  Although opposed to democracy, Lypynsky's national and class inclusiveness was also opposed to the totalitarian ideology of his rival Dmytro Dontsov.

Works
Szlachta na Ukrainie. Udział jej w życiu narodu na tle jego dziejów (1909)
Stanisław Michał Krzyczewski. Z dziejów walki szlachty ukraińskiej w szeregach powstańczych pod wodzą Bohdana Chmielnickiego (1912)
Z dziejów Ukrainy. Księga pamiątkowa ku czci Włodzimierza Antonowicza, Paulina Święcickiego i Tadeusza Rylskiego, wydana staraniem dr. J. Jurkiewicza, Fr. Wolskiej, Ludw. Siedleckiego i Wacława Lipińskiego (1913)
 Lysty do brativ chiliborobiv (1926)

Sources 
 Dovidnyk z istoriï Ukraïny, 3-Volumes, "Vyacheslav Lypynsky" (t. 2), Kyiv, 1993-1999,  (t. 1),  (t. 2),  (t. 3).

External links 
 Encyclopedia of Ukraine
 Lypynsky on the imperative of political independence

1882 births
1931 deaths
People from Volyn Oblast
People from Volhynian Governorate
Jagiellonian University alumni
University of Geneva alumni
Polish nobility
Ruthenian nobility
20th-century Ukrainian historians
Ukrainian democracy activists
Ukrainian monarchists
Ukrainian politicians before 1991
Ukrainian State
Ambassadors of Ukraine to Austria
People who emigrated to escape Bolshevism
Ukrainian people of Polish descent
People from the Russian Empire of Polish descent
Russian military personnel of World War I
Recipients of the Order of Saint Stanislaus (Russian), 3rd class